Zoo Quest is a series of multi-part nature documentaries broadcast on the BBC Television Service between 1954 and 1963. It was the first major programme to feature David Attenborough.

In each series, Attenborough travelled with staff from London Zoo to a tropical country to capture an animal for the zoo's collection (the accepted practice at the time). Although the programme was structured around the quest for the animal, it also featured film of other wildlife in the area and of the local people and their customs. Attenborough introduced each programme from the studio and then narrated the film his team had shot on location. At the end of each series, the animals the team had captured were introduced in the studio, where experts from the zoo discussed them.

With the exception of the original 1954 series (which survives as edited compilations repeated the following year), all episodes of Zoo Quest exist in the BBC Archives. The series was the most popular wildlife programme of its time in Britain, and established Attenborough's career as a nature documentary presenter.

Production
The seed for Zoo Quest was sown when Attenborough produced and presented a three-part nature programme, The Pattern of Animals, in the early 1950s. While researching animals for this programme, he befriended Jack Lester, the curator of the reptile house at London Zoo. Lester invited Attenborough to come along and film an expedition to Sierra Leone. In addition to capturing snakes for the zoo, Lester hoped to catch a white-necked rockfowl (Picathartes gymnocephalus), which had never been kept in a European zoo before. Attenborough, whose previous programmes had been studio-bound, was eager for a chance to film animals in the wild. He also thought the quest for the bird would make a compelling central story for the series. Attenborough and Lester were soon joined by a young Czech photographer, Charles Lagus, who would serve as Attenborough's cameraman and travelling companion throughout Zoo Quest'''s run. The team overcame the objections of BBC management to film the trip on 16mm film instead of the 35mm film that was then the corporation's standard. As a result, colour film stock was used, as it gave the best picture quality for the format. (The BBC did not begin colour broadcasting until 1967.)

The original plan was for Lester to present the studio portion of the programme, while Attenborough produced it. However, Lester developed an unknown tropical disease soon after returning from Africa, and was able to present only one installment before being taken into hospital. (After several recurrences of this illness Lester died in 1956 at the age of 47.) Because the programme had already been scheduled, Attenborough took over the presenter's role.

The first series, called simply Zoo Quest, gained viewers with each episode, and Attenborough found himself being stopped in the street and asked 'Are you going to catch that bird or not?'. Six sequels followed, each named according to its theme. For example, Zoo Quest for a Dragon featured the first ever television footage of the Komodo dragon, while Quest for the Paradise Birds was centred on the birds-of-paradise of New Guinea.

Attenborough wrote a book to accompany each series except the first. The books were later reprinted in abridged form as a two-volume set in the 1980s. Lagus also wrote two books inspired by the programme: Operation Noah's Ark and Benjamin, the Zoo Quest Bear.By the time Quest Under Capricorn was completed, Attenborough felt that the series had run its course. The practice of catching wild animals for zoos had also begun to fall out of favour as zoos became more aware of their environmental impact. (Today London Zoo only captures animals in the wild if a species is so endangered that a captive breeding programme is its only hope.) Attenborough spent the next eight years as an administrator, rising to become Controller of Programming of both BBC 1 and 2, at the BBC before returning to full-time programme-making with Eastwards with Attenborough in 1973.

Several episodes of Zoo Quest and Quest Under Capricorn are available to view on the BBC iPlayer Archives section.

Series
 Zoo Quest (1954)
 Zoo Quest to Guiana (1955) 6 episodes
 Zoo Quest to West Africa (1955) 1 episode
 Zoo Quest for a Dragon (1956) 6 episodes
 Quest for the Paradise Birds (1957) 6 episodes
 Zoo Quest in Paraguay (1959) 6 episodes
 Zoo Quest to Madagascar (1961) 5 episodes
 Quest Under Capricorn (1963) 6 episodes

Zoo Quest in Colour
In 2016, the BBC announced that footage of the first three expeditions had been unearthed by the BBC Natural History Unit that was found to have been shot in colour. At the time of the programme's inception in the 1950s, the BBC's film unit preferred 35mm film for use in television programmes. However, 35 mm cameras were often big and unwieldy, and Attenborough wished to use the more lightweight, handheld 16 mm film cameras for filming Zoo Quest abroad. The BBC eventually relented, but only on the condition that colour film stock was used, as it allegedly gave the best picture quality for the format. (The BBC did not begin routine colour broadcasting until 1967 at the earliest.) This film was then stored away and forgotten about, until 2015, when an archivist looking over the reels of film realised they were in fact in colour.

As a result, a special programme, Zoo Quest in Colour, was screened on BBC Four on 17 May 2016. 90 minutes in duration, the programme uses footage from the first three episodes, featuring the best footage from Zoo Quest trips to West Africa and South America. It also includes the best scenes from Zoo Quest for a Dragon, in which a Komodo dragon was filmed in the wild for the first time. A few shots are in black and white, due to being filmed in low-light conditions on more sensitive black and white stock, and the programme also includes some of the framing black and white studio footage. All of the colour material was remastered direct from the original negative, and is therefore of much higher quality than the grainy and somewhat worn black and white kinescope film prints that had previously been used.

Attenborough said: "I was astonished when someone said we've got nearly all the film of the first three expeditions you did in colour. I said, 'it's impossible, we shot in black and white'." He then went on to recall the original reasoning for the use of colour film stock.

Music
The theme music in the UK was "Peter" from Peter and the Wolf, Op.67 (Prokofiev). The opening and closing music for the Paraguay programmes was "La Llegada" ("The Arrival"), composed by Enrique Samaniego the famous Paso Yobai harpist.

 Books 

 By David Attenborough 

 Zoo Quest to Guiana (1956)
 Zoo Quest for a Dragon (1957), reprinted the following year with an additional chapter of material from the Quest for the Paradise Birds series
 Zoo Quest in Paraguay (1959)
 Quest in Paradise (1960), an accompaniment to the anthropological TV series The People of Paradise Zoo Quest to Madagascar (1961)
 Quest Under Capricorn (1963)
 The Zoo Quest Expeditions (abridged combined volume of the first three books, 1980)
 Journeys to the Past (abridged combined volume of the next three books, 1981)Zoo Quest for a Dragon, Quest in Paradise and Quest Under Capricorn were released as audiobooks between 2006 and 2008, read by Attenborough.

 By Charles Lagus 

 Benjamin, the Zoo Quest Bear (1957)
 Operation Noah's Ark'' (1960)

References

External links 
 
 David Attenborough's Zoo Quest in Colour
 
 BBC Archives – David Attenborough collection

BBC television documentaries
Documentary films about nature
1950s British documentary television series
1960s British documentary television series
1954 British television series debuts
1963 British television series endings
Black-and-white British television shows
English-language television shows